Fabio Bidini (born in Arezzo on 11 June 1968) is an Italian pianist. He was a finalist at the Van Cliburn International Piano Competition in Fort Worth in 1993. He teaches at the Colburn School in Los Angeles, where he holds a piano chair endowed by philanthropist Carol Colburn Grigor. Previously he taught at the Hochschule für Musik "Hanns Eisler" in Berlin, Germany. Since 2016 he teaches at the Hochschule für Musik und Tanz Köln in Cologne, Germany.

References

External links
Official website
Live Concert Videoclips on Google Video: 
Website of the Universität der Künste

1968 births
Living people
Prize-winners of the Ferruccio Busoni International Piano Competition
Italian male pianists
21st-century pianists
21st-century Italian male musicians